Kylie Adams is an American fiction author of young adult fiction novels and contemporary romance, women's fiction, chick lit and holiday contemporary romance novels and short stories.

The Only Thing Better Than Chocolate and Santa Baby, Holiday Contemporary Romance short story collections which she contributed to were USA Today Bestsellers, and many of her works have been translated into several languages.

Personal life
Kyle Adams lives in Oregon, United States.

Books
Source: Fiction Database

Stand-alone novels
Fly Me to the Moon (2001)
Baby, Baby (2002)
Ex-Girlfriends (2005)
Beautiful Liars (2008)

Holiday Romance anthologies
The Only Thing Better Than Chocolate (with Janet Dailey and Sandra Sandra Steffen) (2001)
The Night Before Christmas (with Lori Foster, Erin McCarthy, Jill Shalvis, Kathy Love, and Katherine Garbera) (2006)
Santa Baby (with Lisa Plumley, Elaine Coffman and Lisa Jackson) (2011)

So Little Time series
Dating Game (2003)

New York Minute series
The Secret of Jane's Success (2004)

The Bridesmaid Chronicles
The Bridesmaid Chronicles: First Kiss (2005)

Fast Girls, Hot Boys
Cruel Summer (2006)
Beautiful Disaster (2006)
Bling Addiction (2006)

References

Year of birth missing (living people)
Living people
21st-century American novelists
American women novelists
21st-century American women writers
Novelists from Oregon
American young adult novelists
American romantic fiction novelists
Women writers of young adult literature
Women romantic fiction writers